David Morton (23 July 1861 – 7 May 1937) was a Scotland international  rugby union player. After his playing career, he became a rugby union referee.

Rugby Union career

Amateur career

He played as a forward for West of Scotland.

Provincial career

He represented Glasgow District against Edinburgh District in 1886.

International career

Morton was capped for Scotland  from 1887; and played in 4 Home Nation Championships; the last being in 1890. Making 9 appearances, he scored 3 tries - this was an era when scoring a try only earned a single point.

Referee career

Morton refereed in the Scottish Unofficial Championship in 1891.

He refereed the Inter-City match between Glasgow District and Edinburgh District in 1891 and 1892.

He refereed in the match between Wales and England in the 1893 Home Nations tournament.

Administrative career

Morton became the 20th President of the Scottish Rugby Union. He served the 1892-93 term in office.

References

1861 births
1937 deaths
Scottish rugby union players
Scotland international rugby union players
Rugby union forwards
Glasgow District (rugby union) players
West of Scotland FC players
Scottish rugby union referees
Scottish Districts referees
Scottish Unofficial Championship referees
Presidents of the Scottish Rugby Union
Rugby union players from Glasgow